Marcus Adams may refer to:

 Marcus Adams (director), British film director
 Marcus Adams (photographer) (1875–1959), British society photographer
 Marcus Adams (Canadian football) (born 1979), Canadian football defensive tackle
 Marcus Adams (footballer) (born 1993), Australian Football League defender

See also
 Marcus Adam (born 1968), English athlete
Mark Adams (disambiguation)